Sir Hew Dalrymple-Hamilton, 4th Baronet (1774 – 23 February 1834) was a British politician.

He was the eldest son of Sir Hew Dalrymple, 3rd Baronet. He succeeded his father in February, 1800 and took the additional surname of Hamilton.

He matriculated at Christ Church, Oxford on 24 October 1791. On 16 June 1814, he was made a DCL.

He served in the British Army as an Ensign in the 1st Foot Guards from 1792, as a lieutenant and captain from 1794 and as a major in the 28th Light Dragoons from 1799 to c.1800.

He was the Member of Parliament (MP) for Haddingtonshire 1795–1800, Ayrshire 1803-1807 and 1811–1818 and Haddington Burghs 1820–1826.

He died at Bargany in 1834. He had married the Hon. Jane Duncan, daughter of Adam Duncan, 1st Viscount Duncan and had one daughter. He was succeeded in the baronetcy by his brother Sir John Hamilton-Dalrymple, 5th Baronet.

References

External links 
 

1774 births
1834 deaths
Alumni of Christ Church, Oxford
Baronets in the Baronetage of Nova Scotia
Grenadier Guards officers
Members of the Parliament of Great Britain for Scottish constituencies
British MPs 1790–1796
British MPs 1796–1800
Members of the Parliament of the United Kingdom for Scottish constituencies
UK MPs 1802–1806
UK MPs 1806–1807
UK MPs 1807–1812
UK MPs 1812–1818
UK MPs 1820–1826
British Army personnel of the Napoleonic Wars